Ouyang Qin (1900 – May 15, 1978) original name Yang Qing, was a People's Republic of China politician. He was born in Ningxiang County, Hunan Province and educated in Changsha. His parents died when he was young. In 1926, he participated in the Northern Expedition. After the creation of the People's Republic of China, he served as Communist Party of China Committee Secretary and Governor of Heilongjiang Province.

1900 births
1978 deaths
People of the Northern Expedition
People's Republic of China politicians from Hunan
Chinese Communist Party politicians from Hunan
Governors of Heilongjiang
CCP committee secretaries of Heilongjiang
Delegates to the 1st National People's Congress
Vice Chairpersons of the National Committee of the Chinese People's Political Consultative Conference
People from Ningxiang
Politicians from Changsha